Boris Mahon de Monaghan (born 11 February 1986) is a French professional footballer who plays for Championnat National 3 club Albères Argelès.

Career 
Mahon de Monaghan has played at the professional level in Ligue 2 for Sedan, Créteil, and Gazélec Ajaccio. He was the record appearance holder for Créteil before being overtaken by teammate Vincent Di Bartoloméo.

References

1986 births
Living people
Footballers from Orléans
Association football defenders
French footballers
CS Sedan Ardennes players
US Orléans players
US Créteil-Lusitanos players
Gazélec Ajaccio players
Canet Roussillon FC players

Ligue 2 players
Championnat National players
Championnat National 3 players
Championnat National 2 players